Taiyuan No. 3 Prison is a prison in Nancheng District in Shanxi province of China. It is connected to a gas compressor factory. It was founded in 1952.

References

See also
 Jinzhong Prison

1952 establishments in China
Prisons in China
Buildings and structures in Xinzhou